The women's 200 metre breaststroke competition at the 2006 Pan Pacific Swimming Championships took place on August 20 at the Saanich Commonwealth Place.  The last champion was Amanda Beard of US.

This race consisted of four lengths of the pool, all in breaststroke.

Records
Prior to this competition, the existing world and Pan Pacific records were as follows:

Results
All times are in minutes and seconds.

Heats
The first round was held on August 20, at 10:38.

B Final 
The B final was held on August 20, at 19:27.

A Final 
The A final was held on August 20, at 19:27.

References

2006 Pan Pacific Swimming Championships
2006 in women's swimming